Three-time defending champion Shingo Kunieda and his partner Stéphane Houdet defeated Gordon Reid and Ronald Vink in the final, 3–6, 6–4, [10–6] to win the men's doubles wheelchair tennis title at the 2013 French Open.

Frédéric Cattaneo and Kunieda were the reigning champions, but Cattaneo did not compete.

Seeds
 Stéphane Houdet /  Shingo Kunieda (champions)
 Gordon Reid /  Ronald Vink (final)

Draw

Finals

References
 Draw

Wheelchair Men's Doubles
French Open, 2013 Men's Doubles